İsmailli (also: Aşağıismailli) is a village in the Kastamonu District, Kastamonu Province, Turkey. Its population is 145 (2021).

References

Villages in Kastamonu District